Jean Basset may refer to:

Jean Basset (died 1707), French Catholic priest in China
Jean Basset (died 1715), French Catholic priest in New France